Carolyn Crawford is a Republican politician from Pass Christian, Mississippi, serving as a member of the Mississippi House of Representatives from the 121st district. She was first elected in 2011, unseating Democratic incumbent Diane Peranich.

Crawford is an enrolled member of the Saginaw Chippewa Tribal Nation.

References 

Living people
Republican Party members of the Mississippi House of Representatives
Native American state legislators
Native American women in politics
Women state legislators in Mississippi
Year of birth missing (living people)
21st-century American politicians
21st-century American women politicians
Ojibwe people